The Bridge Street Commercial Historic District is located in Chippewa Falls, Wisconsin.

Description
The district includes 33 contributing properties built from 1873 to 1943, including the Romanesque Revival First National Bank built in 1873, several Italianate buildings from the 1880s, the 1890 Caesar Harness Shop, and the 1908 Neoclassical Federal Building.

It was added to the State and the National Register of Historic Places in 1994.

References

Historic districts on the National Register of Historic Places in Wisconsin
National Register of Historic Places in Chippewa County, Wisconsin